"On the Road" (Korean: 너에게 가는 이 길 위에서 (너.이.길); neoege ganeun i gil wieseo (neo.i.gil)) is a song recorded by South Korean singer Baekhyun for the soundtrack of the 2020 television series Hyena. It was released as a digital single on February 29, 2020, by Danal Entertainment.

Lyrics 
The track is a tender ballad along with piano about hoping a special someone can understand your sincere feelings for them.

Chart performance 
"On the Road" debuted at number 130 on South Korea's Gaon Digital Chart for the chart issue dated  February 23–29, 2020 rising and reaching number seventy-six on the following week.

Track listing

Charts

References 

Baekhyun songs
2020 songs
2020 singles
Korean-language songs